Terry Allen (September 12, 1916 – October 1981) was an American baritone vocalist active during the Big Band era.

Career 
In 1938, Allen joined Red Norvo's band, performing the vocals on a number of Norvo's recordings, especially "I Get Along Without You Very Well," a big Norvo hit in 1939. In 1939, he joined Larry Clinton's band and recorded a hit in 1940, "My Greatest Mistake." Allen moved to Claude Thornhill's band in 1941 and Will Bradley's in 1942. Allen also, in 1942, sang with Hal McIntyre. 

In August 1944, after being honorably discharged from the United States Navy, Allen began performing with Johnny Long and His Orchestra at the New Yorker hotel. In 1947, he recorded "Jade Green" (Edmund Anderson, words; David Broekman, music) and "Another Memory" (Atlantic 683) with the David Broekman (fr) Orchestra.

References

1916 births
1981 deaths
Big band singers
20th-century American singers
20th-century American male singers
American male jazz musicians
United States Navy personnel of World War II